José Antonio Rivera (born April 7, 1973) is an American professional boxer of Puerto Rican descent. He is a former WBA welterweight and super welterweight champion.

Professional career 
October 1992 marked the date Jose became a professional boxer. From here he fought his way to becoming Massachusetts State Champion twice, the USBA Regional Champion, the IBO World Champion, and the NABA Champion.

On September 13, 2003, in Germany, Jose fought unbeaten European Champion Michel Trabant and walked away with the WBA Welterweight Championship of the World.

On April 2, 2005, in his defense of the WBA title, Jose lost a very close split decision to his challenger Luis Collazo.

On May 6, 2006, Jose would move up a weight class to Junior Middleweight and fight Champion Alejandro Garcia. He managed to knock him down five times and won to become the new WBA Champion.

On January 6, 2007, Jose defended his new WBA title against Travis Simms but lost in a ninth-round TKO (Technical Knock Out).

In October he was KOd by Daniel Santos. He had announced his intention to retire before that fight, and did so.

Jose made a brief one-fight comeback in August 2008, beating Clarence Taylor in an 8-round decision, then retired again after suffering a hand injury. He plans to make a second comeback in his hometown of Worcester, Mass., on May 20, 2011, against Luis Maysonet.

See also 
 List of WBA world champions
 List of Puerto Rican boxing world champions

External links 
 

1973 births
Boxers from Philadelphia
Light-middleweight boxers
Living people
Sportspeople from Worcester, Massachusetts
World Boxing Association champions
Welterweight boxers
World light-middleweight boxing champions
Puerto Rican male boxers
American male boxers